Ten Thousand Angels is the debut studio album of American country music singer Mindy McCready. It was released on BNA Records in 1996 and sold two million copies being certified double platinum by the RIAA. The album peaked at #5 on the US country charts, and producing four chart singles on the country charts. The first single, which was the title track, reached #6, and was followed by her only #1 hit, "Guys Do It All the Time". Following this song was "Maybe He'll Notice Her Now", which featured backing vocals from Richie McDonald, the lead singer of the band Lonestar. This song peaked at #18. "A Girl's Gotta Do (What a Girl's Gotta Do)" was the final single, reaching #4 in 1997.

Track listing

Personnel
Richard "Spady" Brannan – bass guitar
Kathy Burdick – background vocals
Larry Byrom – acoustic guitar
Paul Franklin – steel guitar
Sonny Garrish – steel guitar
Rob Hajacos – fiddle
Tom Hemby – acoustic guitar
John Hobbs – piano
Dann Huff – electric guitar
Mary Ann Kennedy – mandolin, background vocals
Paul Leim – drums
Mindy McCready - lead vocals
Terry McMillan – harmonica
Jimmy Nichols – piano, keyboards, synthesizer strings, background vocals
Don Potter – acoustic guitar
Norro Wilson – background vocals
Richie McDonald - background vocals (track 4)

Strings performed by the Nashville String Machine; Carl Gorodetzky, concert master. String arrangements by Ronn Huff.

Production
Produced By David Malloy
Engineers: Kevin Beamish, Tonya Ginnetti, David Malloy, Jimmy Nichols, Warren Peterson, J. Gary Smith
Assistant Engineers: Mark Beronulli, Mark Hagen, Joe Hayden, Mel Jones, King Williams
Mixing: Kevin Beamish
Digital Editing: Carlos Grier
Mastering: Denny Purcell, Jonathan Russell

Charts

Weekly charts

Year-end charts

References

External links
[ Allmusic]

1996 debut albums
BNA Records albums
Mindy McCready albums
Albums produced by David Malloy